The intermediate station Avenida Cali is part of the TransMilenio mass-transit system of Bogotá, Colombia, opened in the year 2000.

Location

The station is located in northwestern Bogotá, specifically on Calle 80 with Carrera 85 A, one block from Avenida Ciudad de Cali.

History

In 2000, phase one of the TransMilenio system was opened between Portal de la 80 and Tercer Milenio, including this station.

The station is named Avenida Cali due to its location on the west side of the intersection of Avenida Ciudad de Cali (which is elevated by a bridge) and Avenida Calle 80.

It serves the demand of the La Granja, La Almería, El Morisco, and París Gaitán neighborhoods. Through connections with feeder routes, it also serves the Suba-Rincón area.

Station services

Old trunk services

Main line service

Feeder routes

This station has the following feeder route:

Route 5.2 Avenida Carrera 91 loop

Inter-city service

This station does not have inter-city service.

External links
TransMilenio

See also
Bogotá
TransMilenio
List of TransMilenio Stations

TransMilenio